Thought was launched in Spain in 1803 and came into British hands in 1806. She first appeared in Lloyd's Register in 1806 with Simcock, master, Crowson, owner, and trade Falmouth–St Michael's. She underwent minor repairs in 1806. From St Michael's Thought sailed to the River Clyde. On 27 February 1807 Lloyd's List reported that she had become a total loss at the entrance to the river. Her entire crew  drowned.

Citations

1803 ships
Ships built in Spain
Age of Sail merchant ships of England
Maritime incidents in 1807
Shipwrecks of Scotland
Ships lost with all hands